The siege of Miletus was Alexander the Great's first siege and naval encounter with the Achaemenid Empire. This siege was directed against Miletus, a city in southern Ionia, which is now located in the Aydın province of modern-day Turkey. During the battle, Parmenion's son Philotas would be key in preventing the Persian Navy from finding safe anchorage. It was captured by Parmenion's son, Nicanor in 334 BC.

References

External links
 Discussion on Livius.org

Miletus
Miletus
334 BC
Miletus